Bennett's Mill Covered Bridge, near Greenup, Kentucky, was built in 1855.  It was listed on the National Register of Historic Places in 1976.

It brings Brown Covered Bridge Road (County Route 2125) over Tygarts Creek, west of Greenup.

It was defended by two hidden cannon during the American Civil War.

See also
 Oldtown Covered Bridge: also in Greenup County, Kentucky
 List of bridges documented by the Historic American Engineering Record in Kentucky
 National Register of Historic Places listings in Greenup County, Kentucky

References

External links

Covered bridges in Kentucky
Historic American Engineering Record in Kentucky
National Register of Historic Places in Greenup County, Kentucky
Bridges completed in 1855
1855 establishments in Kentucky
Bridges in Greenup County, Kentucky